Hapoel Be'er Sheva B.C. is a professional basketball club based in Be'er Sheva, Israel. The team plays in the Israeli Basketball Premier League, the top tier of Israeli basketball and in the Balkan International Basketball League. It plays its home games in the Conch Arena.

History

20th century
The club was founded in 1965 by Eitan Wegmann. During the eighties, the team won the Second League twice. During the nineties, the team disbanded.

21st century
In 2002 the basketball club Hapoel Be'er Sheva rebranded, and started the season in the Fifth League. Within three years it qualified for the Second League.

During the 2006/07 season, the team stood one game away from ascending to the Israeli Basketball Premier League, but lost the final game of a 5-game series in the Liga Leumit (Second League) finals to Hapoel Holon.  This series has been recalled as one of the hardest-fought series in the history of the Second League. A season later Be'er Sheva was eliminated in the quarter-finals of the Second League playoffs.

In order to continue to maintain the club's youth department, called "Future of the Negev", then-chairman Mario Levy and his son Rami (then director) once again rebranded the team in the summer of 2008, and assumed management of the club's youth department starting from the 2008/2009 season. The new team began to play in the Fifth League, and at the end of the season the team progressed to the Fourth League. A season later, the team fought relegation, and in the last cycle of the league remained in the league.

At the beginning of the 2011/2012 season, the men's team was united with Beitar Be'er Sheva under the title of Municipal Be'er Sheva. The united team competed in Liga Artzit (the Third League). The leadership of the club was assumed by local businessman owner and chairman Kfir Arazi, who joined during the summer. The team was re-branded under his ownership, and competed again in the local Fourth League.

In the summer of 2013 the heads of clubs Hapoel Be'er Sheva and Beitar/Municipal Be'er Sheva understood that success required full cooperation between the clubs, paving the way for full convergence between the two clubs under the name "Hapoel Be'er Sheva." Hapoel Be'er Sheva finished the 2013/2014 season in first place in the Fourth League, and at the end of the season returned to the Artzit (3rd) League.

In the summer of 2014 the club signed sponsorship deals with two major entities, the Bnei Shimon Regional Council and the Altshuler Shaham investment house, thus assuring the financial longevity of the club. Kfir Arazi owned and steered the club. American–Israeli Chris Watson played for the team in 2014-16. On 29 March 2015 Be'er Sheva ensured its rise to the Liga Leumit with a home victory over Hapoel Lod, 56:82.

The 2015-2016 season began well with Beer Sheva consistently at the top of the league, aiming squarely at the Premier League. However, after a series of critical injuries and some locker-room trouble the team lost its bid in the first round of the playoffs, and remained in the Liga Leumit (2nd League).

The 2016-2017 season began with a new coaching team, Yaniv Burger and Zach Schneider, and an almost new team which included Jeff Allen, Jason Williams, David Shamriz, and Ben Eisenhardt. 

On May 22, 2018, Hapoel Be'er Sheva won the National League title and earned promotion to the Israeli Basketball Premier League for the first time in their history, as they swept Maccabi Kiryat Gat 3–0 in the best-of-five series. Storm Warren was named Finals MVP.

Arena

Conch Arena is a multi-purpose sports arena located in Be'er Sheva, and has 3,000 seats.

On 25 February 2014 the arena was inaugurated, by Rubik Danilovich, the mayor of Be'er Sheva, Shmuel Frenkel, chairman of BSL, and Itzik Larry, Chairman of Wiener, before the Premier League All-Star Game.

Season by season

Current roster

Depth chart

Notable players

References

External links 
Hapoel Be'er Sheva B.C. at Eurobasket.com
Hapoel Be'er Sheva B.C. (Hebrew) at Facebook.com

Basketball teams in Israel